Lota may refer to:

Places
Lota (crater), a crater on Mars
Lota, Chile, a city and commune in Chile
Lota, Punjab, village in Pakistan
Lota, Queensland, a suburb of Brisbane, Australia
Lota railway station, a station on the Cleveland line
Lota House, a heritage-listed house in Lota, Queensland

People
Lota (name)

Animals
Lota, former circus elephant who was moved to The Elephant Sanctuary (Hohenwald)
Lota lota or Burbot, a codlike fish

Other uses
Lota (vessel), water vessel used in parts of South Asia
LOTA (Longshoreman of the Apocalypse), a character in the webcomic Schlock Mercenary
LOTA (Licentiate of the Orthodontic Technicians Association)

See also

Lotar (disambiguation)
Lotta (disambiguation)